Goodsoil is a village in the Canadian province of Saskatchewan within the Rural Municipality of Beaver River No. 622 and Census Division No. 17. The Goodsoil Historical Museum Site (c. 1932–45) is a municipal heritage property on the Canadian Register of Historic Places. It is the western gateway to Meadow Lake Provincial Park.

Parks and recreation 
Goodsoil is located about one kilometre south of Meadow Lake Provincial Park's boundary, which is Saskatchewan's largest provincial park. The park has over 25 lakes and features recreational activities including boating, camping, fishing, and swimming.

Eight kilometres west of Goodsoil is Northern Meadows Golf Club, an 18-hole championship course that includes a proshop with rentals and a driving range. The golf course is located on the northern shore of Bousquet Lake along Highway 954.

History 
Goodsoil incorporated as a village on January 1, 1960.

Transportation 
Goodsoil is located along Highway 26 about five kilometres north of Highway 55. At the north end of town, Highway 26 turns into Highway 224 and continues on into Meadow Lake Provincial Park. Highway 954 begins at the north end of town at the junction with Highway 26 / 224 and heads west into Meadow Lake Provincial Park.

Demographics 

Notable people 
 Ron Greschner played for the New York Rangers of the NHL from 1974 to 1990.
 Bob Sweetan, professional wrestler

See also 
 List of communities in Saskatchewan
 Villages of Saskatchewan

References

External links

Villages in Saskatchewan
Beaver River No. 622, Saskatchewan
Division No. 17, Saskatchewan